is a town located in Saitama Prefecture, Japan. , the town had an estimated population of 10,880 in 4750 households and a population density of 190 persons per km2.

Geography
Tokigawa is located in central Saitama Prefecture.

Surrounding municipalities
Saitama Prefecture
Hannō
Chichibu
Ogawa
Hatoyama
Ranzan
Higashichibu
Yokoze
Ogose

Climate
Tokigawa has a humid subtropical climate (Köppen Cfa) characterized by warm summers and cool winters with light to no snowfall.  The average annual temperature in Tokigawa is 13.8 °C. The average annual rainfall is 1746 mm with September as the wettest month. The temperatures are highest on average in August, at around 25.4 °C, and lowest in January, at around 2.3 °C.

Demographics
Per Japanese census data, the population of Tokigawa peaked around the year 2000 and has declined slightly in the decades since.

History
The villages of Myōkaku and Tamagawa were created within Hiki District, Saitama with the establishment of the modern municipalities system on April 1, 1889. Myōkaku merged with the village of Okunugi from Chichibu District to form the village of Tokigawa on February 1, 1955. Tokigawa and Tamagawa merged to form the town of Tokigawa on February 1, 2006.

Government
Tokigawa has a mayor-council form of government with a directly elected mayor and a unicameral town council of 12 members. Tokigawa, together with the towns of Ranzan, Ogawa and Namekawa, contributes one member to the Saitama Prefectural Assembly. In terms of national politics, the town is part of Saitama 9th district of the lower house of the Diet of Japan.

Economy
Tokigawa is a rural, agricultural community.

Education
Tokigawa has three public elementary schools and two public middle schools operated by the town government. The town does not have a high school.

Transportation

Railway
 JR East – Hachikō Line

Highway
Tokigawa is not served by any expressways or national highways

Local attractions
 Jiko-ji, one of the Bandō Sanjūsankasho temples
 Tokigawa onsen
 Tamagawa onsen

References

External links

Official Website 

Towns in Saitama Prefecture
Hiki District, Saitama
Tokigawa, Saitama